Mylothris leonora is a butterfly in the family Pieridae. It is found in Tanzania (Uluguru Mountains). The habitat consists of montane forests and forest-grassland mosaic.

References

Butterflies described in 1928
Pierini
Endemic fauna of Tanzania
Butterflies of Africa